Emperor Mo (末帝; Mòdì; "The Last Emperor") is a posthumous name typically given to the last emperors of Chinese imperial dynasties, who were without other posthumous names. It may refer to:

 Zhu Youzhen (888–923, reigned 913–923), Emperor Mo of Later Liang
 Li Congke (885–936, reigned 934–936), Emperor Mo of Later Tang  
 Emperor Mo of Western Xia (died 1227, reigned 1226–1227)
 Emperor Mo of Jin (died 1234, reigned in 1234)